The 2001 Liga Perdana 2 season is the fourth season of Liga Perdana 2. A total of 12 teams participated in the season.

Sabah and Brunei were relegated from Liga Perdana 1 while Kedah JKR and PDRM were promoted from Liga FAM to a now increased total number of teams competing in the league from ten to become 12 teams. 

The season kicked off on 2 April 2001. Johor FC won the title and was promoted to Liga Perdana 1 alongside Sabah and NS Chempaka.

Teams

12 teams competing in the fourth season of Liga Perdana 2.

 Johor FC (2001 Liga Perdana 2 champions)
 Sabah
 NS Chempaka
 Brunei
 Kelantan TNB
 Melaka TMFC
 Kelantan JKR
 KL Malay Mail
 Kedah JKR
 PDRM FA
 Kedah FA
 ATM

League table

1.Johor FC  - 47 PTS (2001 Liga Perdana 2 Champions)

2.Sabah  - 45 PTS (Promoted to Liga Perdana 1)

3.NS Chempaka  - 37 PTS (Promoted to Liga Perdana 1)

4.Brunei  - 33 PTS

5.Kelantan TNB  - 32 PTS

6.TM  - 31 PTS

7.Kelantan JKR  - 29 PTS

8.KL Malay Mail  - 24 PTS

9.Kedah JKR  - 24 PTS

10.PDRM FA  - 22 PTS

11.Kedah  - 21 PTS

12.ATM  - 18 PTS

Champions

References

Liga Perdana 2 seasons
1
Malaysia